Afrikaanse Idols was a special season of South African reality interactive show Idols South Africa based on the British talent show Pop Idol. In difference to the rest of the series this season was held entirely in Afrikaans as the host, judges and contestants did not speak English on the show and every song was performed in Afrikaans.
Although the set and stage design remained the same, the entire judging panel was formed new consisting of Afrikaans-speaking singers Mynie Grové, Taliep Petersen, who was murdered just a few weeks after the competition ended and media personality Deon Maas. The show also switched channels to KykNET, an Afrikaans sisters station of MNet and was hosted by boyband member Sean Else (Eden).
The Afrikaans season was aired between the third and fourth English seasons of the show. Dewald Louw from Bloemfontein won the show. Before that he was also a contestant on the second English season of the show where he made the top 24. He also auditioned for season three but failed to progress from the first round. Next to a recording contract with Sony BMG, winner Dewald Louw also won a Peugeot 206, R50,000 from the ATKV, a Shure microphone, R3200 worth of prizes from Look &Listen, a laptop computer and a gift pack from Truworths valued at R10,000.

Auditions took place in Cape Town, Bloemfontein, Port Elizabeth, Johannesburg and for the first time auditions took place internationally in Windhoek, Namibia.

During the Live Galas one guest judge was introduced to the audience each week. They were Jennifer Jones (30 July), Amanda Luyt (6 August), Coenie de Villiers (13 August), Chris Chameleon (20 August) and Kurt Darren (27 August).

Finals

Finalists
(ages stated at time of contest)

Themes
31 July: Favourite Songs
7 August: Dans, Luister, Folk
14 August: Alternative Afrikaans Hits
21 August: Viewers Choice
10 December: Grand Finale

Elimination Chart

References

External links
 Idols website

Idols South Africa
Afrikaans-language television shows
Television shows set in South Africa
Zulu-language television shows
2006 South African television series debuts
2006 South African television series endings
Television series by Fremantle (company)
2000s South African television series